Moctezuma is a station on Line 1 the Mexico City Metro.  It is located in the Colonia Moctezuma and Colonia Balbuena neighborhoods of the Venustiano Carranza borough, to the northeast of the centre of Mexico City.

The station logo portrays a stylised drawing of the feathered headdress of Moctezuma II Xocoyotzin, the penultimate Aztec emperor, for whom the station is named. The station also boasts a display containing a reproduction of the feathered headdress, the original of which is currently held by the Museum of Ethnology in Vienna, Austria.  The station was opened on 4 September 1969.

This station runs under Avenida Ignacio Zaragoza. Back when trolleybus line "F" was still running this metro station connected with it, and the trolleybus ran between Nueva Atzacoalco neighbourhood, north of the city, and Villa Coapa, south of the city. Starting 11 July 2022, the station will remain closed for at least eight months for modernization work on the tunnel and the line's technical equipment.

Ridership

References

External links 
 

Moctezuma
Railway stations opened in 1969
1969 establishments in Mexico
Mexico City Metro stations in Venustiano Carranza, Mexico City
Accessible Mexico City Metro stations